Hinduism is a minority faith in Denmark. There are 40,000 (0.5%) Hindus in Denmark as of 2020.

History
The first Hindus of Sri Lankan Tamil origin came in 1983 because of the escalating conflict in Sri Lanka. It was mostly men, and they were categorized as de facto refugees. Today they have married or have got the family, they had to leave to Denmark, and around half of the Tamils have been granted Danish citizenship.

Hindus of Sri Lankan Tamil origin have realized that there will not be any solution to the conflict in Sri Lanka in the near future, and they have begun to rebuild or reorganize some of their cultural and religious representations in Denmark, so they can cope with the requirements of the traditions and Danish society as well.

Demographics

According to an estimate there were about 12,000 Hindus in Denmark in 2010.

Sri Lankan and Indian origin made up the most significant proportion of Hindus in Denmark, numbering approximately 18,000–19,000 individuals out of a total population of 5.7 million in 2017, Hindus constituted about 0.3 percent of the total population. 

Hinduism is also represented among the ethnic Danish community. About 2,000 Danish ethnic origin, belong to  Hindu-related groups and Hindu-inspired groups.

Temples
There are five Hindu temples in Denmark.
In Denmark there are two consecrated Hindu temples: two dedicated to Vinayakar or the Ganesha and the other to the goddess Abirami apart from the ISKCON temples.

Community
There are 9 registered Hindu groups in Denmark, among which, is the organisation Hindu Swayamsevak Sangh.

In 2011, a Hindu temple in Western Copenhagen was assaulted by a group of young Muslims, throwing stones and breaking windows. A single police officer arrived, took notice of the damage and left again. Half an hour later, a larger group of the same attackers arrived, again throwing stones, entering the garden and breaking all the bottom windows facing the street in the Tulasi room.

See also
Hinduism in Finland
Hinduism in Norway

References

External links
 Association of Indians in denmark 
 Shakti in Denmark - a focal point for many Tamils in Diaspora
ISKCON Centres in Denmark
Tamils: a Trans State Nation - Denmark

Denmark
Religion in Denmark
Denmark